The Detroit Fire Department (DFD) provides fire protection and emergency medical services to the U.S. city of Detroit, Michigan.

The DFD operates 47 fire companies out of 36 fire stations located throughout the city, with a total sworn personnel complement of 1000 members with 821 firefighters in all ranks. It is headquartered at the Detroit Public Safety Headquarters on Third Street, which also houses police, emergency medical services, and additional services.

The DFD responds to approximately 165,000 emergency calls annually, with over 80% being medical emergencies and approximately 9,000 working structural fires. There were 4,741 structure fires in Detroit in 2014, compared with 2,736 in 2018, according to data. As a result, the city is now fighting an average of seven structure fires per day.

Recent history

Department leadership in the 2010s 
From 2011 to December 31, 2013, the Detroit Fire Department was led by Fire Commissioner Donald R. Austin, a former member of the Los Angeles Fire Department and a Detroit native. Under Mayor Dave Bing, Austin had come to Detroit in May 2011 on the difficult mission to bring change to the DFD. He resigned in November 2013 due to changes in city administration.

The new mayor of Detroit, Mike Duggan, named Jonathan Jackson, a 25-year veteran of the department, and a Second Deputy Fire Commissioner under Austin, as the Interim Fire Commissioner on December 23, 2013. Craig Dougherty, a former member of Engine 50 on the city's East Side and Fire Chief under Austin, became a Second Deputy Commissioner under Jackson. The administration was rounded out by Deputy Commissioner Edsel Jenkins, C.P.A., Second Deputy Commissioner Sydney Zack, LL.M., and Second Deputy Commissioner Orlando Gregory.

By the end of March 2014, Commissioner Jackson resigned due to a life-threatening neural disease. On April 8, 2014, Deputy Commissioner Edsel Jenkins was named as the new Executive Fire Commissioner. He resigned in October 2015, and was succeeded in office by Eric Jones.  Executive Fire Commissioner Eric Jones made swift changes and created the new management team of the fire department which included Deputy Commissioner Dave Fornell, 2nd Deputy Commissioner Sydney Zack, and 2nd Deputy Commissioner Charles Simms.

Budget crisis of the 2010s 
As of January 2011, in an effort to reduce costs, the city of Detroit was considering privatizing the Fire Department's EMS Division.

Budget cuts led to the Chief of Department closing a total of 10 Engine Companies and 4 Ladder Companies, effective July 4, 2012. Additionally, 200 firefighters and officers were to be demoted and around 150 laid off initially, with more than 100 to be re-hired as funds were to become available. In addition to the 14 permanently closed companies, a number of units were placed out of service ("browned out") on a daily basis. As a consequence, the standard response to a structural fire was reduced by one engine to 2 engines, 1 ladder, 1 squad and 1 chief.

At the beginning and into the first half of 2013, apparatus availability was at a low point. An estimated 40 units remained in service, with all three aerial platform trucks damaged or defective, and up to eight engine Companies and seven ladder companies browned out. At the end of January 2013, the entire fleet of aerial ladder trucks was found lacking certification for routine operations.

The City of Detroit declared bankruptcy in July 2013.

By 2014, the established practice of using improvised tools like soda pop cans, doorbells, door hinges or pipes to alert firefighters of incoming alarm faxes made national news. Merely 48 pieces of apparatus were available for service, down from 66 in the year 2010. A number of ladder trucks continued to be pressed into service without working aerials.

Post-bankruptcy 
In December 2014, the City of Detroit emerged from bankruptcy protection. Funds for replacement and maintenance of parts of the aging fleet and facilities were included with the new budget. Mutual aid arrangements with fire departments in the two enclaves, the cities of Highland Park and Hamtramck, were formalized in October 2014.

In 2015, with a first batch of ten new fire engines going in service. Previously browned out Engine Company 32 was also reopened. New vehicles bolstered the fleet available to EMS and for fire investigators.

Following 2012's reduction, the standard assignment to a structure fire was again increased to 3 Engines, 1 Truck, 1 Squad and 1 Chief. In 2016, an expanded type of first alarm assignment called Commercial Box Alarm was introduced to better handle fires in structures bigger than a standard dwelling. Six new fire engines were placed in service in 2016, one of them replacing the Quint at Engine Company 48, plus reinstating Ladder Company 13 as a permanently staffed unit. So far, Engine Companies 1, 9, 17, 27, 30, 32, 33, 39, 40, 42, 48, 50, 53, 56, 58, and 59 have all been assigned new Smeal fire apparatus.

For the year 2017, six new HME/Ahrens-Fox Squad trucks, nine Smeal rearmount ladder trucks, two Ferrara platform ladder trucks, eight Ferrara fire engines, fourteen Braun Medic Units and a number of Light and Air units are scheduled to enter service.

Fire activity and investigation

The city of Detroit has to cope with a large number of fires. The number of vacant buildings throughout the city, combined with a dire economic situation, resulted in numerous fires on a daily basis.  About 85% of the fires that occur daily in Detroit occur in vacant homes and buildings.  In 2011 alone, the DFD responded to over 9,000 working structural fires.

Numbers of fires per year declined subsequently, with 4,600 structure fires in 2014 and 3,700 in 2015. On average, Detroit firefighters attended to 11 to 16 fires per day in 2015.

A large number of these fires are believed to be "incendiary" (or arson), far above the national average of about 7.8%. In the early 2010s, there were no accurate statistics for determining the arson rate in Detroit due to the fact that only a fraction of the fires could be investigated by the limited resources of the DFD Arson Unit. Only fire scenes which have been investigated can be ruled as incendiary or arson fires. Those fires which have not been investigated must be classified as "undetermined" unless an investigation is completed.

Operations
The Detroit Fire Department is divided into 8 divisions: Communications, Community Relations, Emergency Medical Services (EMS), Firefighting Operations, Fire Marshal, Apparatus Services, and Training.

Emergency Medical Services
The DFD operates a separate Emergency Medical Services Division. In September 2013, Automated External Defibrillators (AED devices) were put in service on the fire apparatus as a first step into performing life support to citizens as first responders. As of 2015, Detroit firefighters are trained medical first responders and have the ability to handle patient care until Emergency Medical Services units arrive.

The Emergency Medical Services division operates with limited manpower. As a result, many calls are handled by the DFD until a unit is available. The availability of Emergency Medical Services units is often compromised due to the number of calls in a city which has a lot of violence, citizens calling 911 for non-emergencies, as well as the breaking down of the Emergency Medical Services rigs due to age, mileage, and lack of proper maintenance.

Thanks to Mayor Bing's collaboration with the business community, Roger Penske sponsored 23 new ambulances for the department, which were put into service in the summer of 2013. Many of these, however, soon developed defects. More new ambulances were purchased throughout the following years.

Fire station locations 
As of February 2019, there are a total of 38 fire stations in the city of Detroit, not including the Fire Headquarters. There are 27 Engine Companies, 13 Ladder Companies, 6 Tactical Mobile Squads, a Fireboat, and a Hazardous Material Response Unit as well as 24 Medic Ambulances and several specialized units. These fire stations and companies are organized into 8 battalions, each headed by one Battalion Chief each shift.

Organization

Division/Rank structure
Below is the division and rank structure of the Detroit Fire Department, including car/radio callsign designations.

Administration Division (100 callsigns)
Executive Fire Commissioner (EFC) (100)
First Deputy Commissioner (FDC) (101)
Second Deputy Commissioner (SDC) (102, 103, 104)

Firefighting Division (200 callsigns)
Chief of Department (200)
Deputy Chief (DC) (201, 202)
Senior Battalion Chief (SBC) (203)
Battalion Chief (BC)
Captain (Capt.)
Senior Lieutenant (Lt.)
Lieutenant (Lt.)
Sergeant (Sgt.)
Fire Engine Operator (FEO.)
Firefighter Driver (FFD.)
Senior Firefighter (SFF.)
Firefighter (FF.)
Firefighter-Paramedic
Firefighter-EMT
Trial Firefighter (TFF.)

Fireboat
Fire Boat Operator
Fire Boat Deckhand
Fire Boat Mechanic

Medical Division (300 callsigns)
Medical director (300)

Communications Division (400 callsigns)
Chief of Communications (400)
Assistant Chief of Communications (401)
Captain (402)
Lieutenant (403-406)
Sergeant (407-410) 
Fire Dispatcher (410-432)
Probationary Fire Dispatcher

Apparatus Division (500 callsigns)
Senior Supervisor (500)
Repairman (501-505)

Emergency Medical Services Division (1100 callsigns)
Chief of EMS (Superintendent, 1100)
Assistant Chief of EMS (Assistant Superintendent, 1101)
Administrative Captain (1102) / Field Captain (1103) / Captain of EMS Training (1120)
Field Lieutenant (1104-1107) / Administrative Lieutenant (1112-1113) / Lieutenant of EMS Training (1121)
Emergency Medical Technician-Paramedic (EMT-P)
Probationary Paramedic
Emergency Medical Technician (EMT)
Probationary Technician

Communications

Response guidelines

Additional EMS units are added at the discretion of Medical Incident Command on scene.

Notable members 
 Terry Duerod, a former NBA player and Detroit-area native, served on the force for 27 years after his basketball career, retiring in 2016.

See also

Government of Detroit
Detroit Public Safety Headquarters

Notes

References

External links
 Detroit Fire Department
 Detroit Firehouse

 
Fire departments in Michigan
Government of Detroit